Kabhi Aaye Na Judaai (English: "Let separation never come") was an Indian Hindi daily soap opera on Star Plus. It is a story of a united family which finds itself confronted with the biggest temptation of all times - money.

Plot 
The story deals with the problems that money brings to a family along with changing the fabric of their relationships. How a happy family breaks down due to the temptation that money brings. The series focuses on how the relationship between Rajeshwar and Radhika changes despite it surviving the tests of time, and on the story of Kanya and how her life changes after marriage.

Cast 
 Shilpa Shinde / Aanchal Anand  / Pooja Ghai Rawal as Kanya Malhotra (2001) / (2002) / (2002 - 2003)
 Tarun Khanna as Sameer 
 Prabhat Bhattacharya as Dev
 Nasir Khan as Siddharth Khurana
 Indira Krishnan as Radhika
 Ram Kapoor as Rajeshwar Agnihotri
 Harsh Somaiya / Aamir Dalvi as Aditya 
 Amit Varma as Rahul
 Kapil Soni as Shiv
 Nisha Sareen as Raveena
 Vishal Watwani
 Jaya Bhattacharya
 Kanika Maheshwari
Sanjeev Tyagi

References

External links
 Deepit Bhatnagar (production company)

2001 Indian television series debuts
2003 Indian television series endings
Indian television soap operas
Indian television series
StarPlus original programming